Cecilia Marcos Nabal (born 3 November 2001) is a Spanish footballer who plays as a forward and midfielder for Real Sociedad.

Club career
Marcos started her career at Añorga.

References

External links
Profile at Real Sociedad

2001 births
Living people
Women's association football forwards
Women's association football midfielders
Spanish women's footballers
Footballers from San Sebastián
Añorga KKE players
Real Sociedad (women) players
Primera División (women) players